Prescott High School is comprehensive public junior/senior high school located in Prescott, Arkansas, United States. The southwest Arkansas school serves students in grades 7 through 12 and is administered by the Prescott School District.

Academics 
The assumed course of study for students follows the Smart Core curriculum developed by the Arkansas Department of Education (ADE), which requires students complete at least 22 units to graduate. Students engage in regular courses and exams and may take Advanced Placement (AP) coursework and exams with the opportunity for college credit.

Extracurricular activities
The Prescott High School mascot and athletic emblem is uniquely known as the Curley Wolves with maroon and white serving as the school colors.

For 2020-2021, the Prescott Curley Wolves compete in interscholastic competition in the 3A Region 5 Conference administered by the Arkansas Activities Association including  football, golf (boys/girls), cross country (boys/girls), basketball (boys/girls), competitive cheer, baseball, softball, tennis (boys/girls), and track and field (boys/girls).
 Football: The Curley Wolves football team has won state football championships in 1972, 1973, 1975, 1995, and 2016.
 Track and field: The boys track and field team are 13-time state champions including championships in 1986, 1989, 1992, 2007-2009, 2012, 2015, 2017-2022(no meet in 2020 due to covid-19)Runners up in 2010,2011,2014,2016 
 Basketball: The girls basketball team won a state championship in 1971.
 Band: The Prescott High School Marching Band won the 1st Arkansas 3A State Marching Championship in 2016.

References

External links 
 

Public high schools in Arkansas
Schools in Nevada County, Arkansas
Prescott, Arkansas